Home and Away is an Australian television soap opera. It was first broadcast on the Seven Network on 17 January 1988. The following is a list of characters that first appeared in 2012, by order of first appearance. The 25th season of Home and Away began airing from 23 January 2012. Until mid April, characters are introduced by the soap's executive producer, Cameron Welsh. Thereafter, they are introduced by his successor, Lucy Addario. January also saw Peter Phelps debut as Alan Henderson. Henrietta Brown arrived in February, while Christy Clarke began appearing from March. Melissa Gregg and Lottie Ryan made their first appearances in April. Jett James, Natalie Davison and Danny Braxton made their debuts in May. Kyle Bennett and Tim Graham arrived in August, while Tamara Kingsley, Lisa Flemming, Adam Sharpe and his son, Jamie Sharpe, began appearing from October.

Alan Henderson

Alan Henderson, played by Peter Phelps, made his first on screen appearance on 23 January 2012. The character and casting was announced on 22 December 2011. Alan is the father of Stu Henderson (Brenton Thwaites). Phelps was reunited with Robert Mammone (Sid Walker), who he previously worked with on Stingers. Mammone said "Peter and I have known each other for 20 years. It's like a school reunion when you work with actors that you've worked with before for a long time. It's been lots of fun."

Alan is visiting his son in the hospital, when he runs into Sid Walker, the man who beat Stu up for physically abusing his daughter. Alan confronts Sid and threatens to beat him up. Sid apologises and tells Alan that there has been too much violence already. Alan agrees and walks away. Alan later confronts Sasha Bezmel (Demi Harman) about sending naked pictures to boys and her accusations against Stu. Sid drags Alan away and they have a physical confrontation. Alan comes to the Walker's home and offers Sid a deal; drop the charges against Stu or have the police arrest him for assaulting him at the hospital. Alan later catches Stu with Sasha and he hits his son. When Stu is found dead, Alan is questioned by the police over his behaviour towards his son. Alan tells them to ask Dexter Walker (Charles Cottier) and Xavier Austin (David Jones-Roberts) about Stu, as they were looking for him shortly before he died. Alan and his wife Margaret (Susan Prior) attend a memorial service for Stu at the school. Alan goes to Angelo's for a drink and he collapses in front on Sid. Alan is taken to the hospital and Sid gets his heart restarted. Alan tells Dexter that he has regrets and later takes back his complaint against Sid, allowing him to get his job back. Alan collapses again and is brought into the hospital. Sid believes Alan's medication may be wrong and gains permission from him to go to his house and look at it. Sid later realises Margaret has been poisoning Alan and she is arrested. When Alan learns of the news he decides to leave the hospital and knocks over a nurse when she tries to stop him. Alan attends Sasha's court hearing and is angry when she is found not guilty.

Henrietta Brown

Henrietta "Henri" Brown, played by Emma Leonard, made her first on screen appearance on 6 February 2012. Henri is a substitute teacher, who gets a job at Summer Bay High. She is also Heath Braxton's (Dan Ewing) ex-girlfriend. In late January 2012, it was announced an "old flame" of Heath's would arrive in the Bay and cause April Scott (Rhiannon Fish) to fear she will lose him. Of this, the show's new series producer Lucy Addario said "There's a juicy love triangle [coming up] between April, Heath and a gorgeous woman from Heath's past." Daniel Kilkelly of Digital Spy said Henri "soon starts trying to rekindle her connection with Heath." Sarah Morgan of the Daily Record said "Henri is an odd name for a woman, but she certainly knows how to turn men's heads – especially Heath's." Henri later becomes attracted to her student, and Heath's brother, Casey (Lincoln Younes). Henri and Casey kiss twice, which leaves the audience wondering whether "a full-blown teacher-pupil relationship" could be about to happen. Younes said he was "worried and excited" about the controversial storyline and added "I think for the moment, it's going to be that playful, dangerous line between risk-taking and the possible repercussions that could come. Right now, it's hard to say where this will go." A writer from TV Buzz said that "Henri may be an excellent teacher, but were not sure she should be tutoring young Casey in lessons of love."

Gina Austin (Sonia Todd) hires Henri as a substitute English teacher for Summer Bay High. Henri reveals she used to attend the school when she was younger. Henri befriends Bianca Scott (Lisa Gormley) and reconnects with Heath Braxton. She later asks him out for a drink. Henri turns up at Heath's on the day of Bianca's wedding with beers. They talk about their past, but are interrupted by April Scott. Henri realises Heath has been dating April. Henri attends a cage fight and runs into Heath. She later tells April about it. Henri comes to Bianca and tells her April failed to do something for an assignment due to her boyfriend. April becomes upset with Henri when she receives a bad mark and accuses her of being jealous of her and Heath. Casey Braxton (Lincoln Younes) confides in Henri about an incident that he was involved in while in juvenile detention. Heath comes to Henri after an argument with April and they have sex. Heath asks Henri to keep their one-night stand quiet and Henri later gives April a good mark in class. Heath confronts Henri, but she tells him she is not playing games. Henri pursues Heath and books a room for them at a motel. However, April finds the details of the booking and shows up thinking the room is for her and Heath. Henri reveals her affair with Heath to April and later, Bianca. Henri decides to break things off with Heath. When Casey learns of Henri's affair with Heath, he confronts her. She becomes upset and later tells Casey she cannot tutor him any more. Henri assures him that she does not have feelings for Heath and they kiss. Casey tells Gina that he wants to quit school and she asks Henri to talk to him. Henri agrees to resume tutoring Casey and they begin a relationship in secret.

Christy Clarke

Christy Clarke, played by Isabelle Cornish, made her debut screen appearance on 6 March 2012. The character and Cornish's casting was announced in late February 2012. The actress has an extended guest role with the show. Cornish initially auditioned for the role of Sasha Bezmel, however, it was actress Demi Harman who was eventually cast.

Of her character and casting, Cornish told Richard Clune of The Daily Telegraph "I get to play the bad girl Christy, the new girl who comes in and causes some trouble. She's so mean, it was so much fun to play." The actress described her character as "flawlessly groomed, popular and demanding attention." A writer for TV Week revealed Christy is involved with one of the show's biggest 2012 storylines – who killed Stu Henderson (Brenton Thwaites)? Cornish explained that Christy was good friends with Stu and she had a crush on him. When she learns he is dead, she becomes upset and then determined to find out who is responsible. Christy turns to Stu's ex-girlfriend, Sasha, and she lashes out at her. Cornish revealed "Christy doesn't like Sasha. Her aim is to destroy her. She tries to get rid of her friends, bully her and make her uncomfortable." The actress added that she had to make herself believe Sasha was a bad person and that she wanted to make her feel unhappy.

Christy starts bullying Sasha Bezmel after it is revealed she accidentally killed Stu Henderson. Christy manages to convince Alicia Spears (Chelsea Giles) to reject Sasha's friendship. Christy kicks Sasha during break and pretends it was an accident in front of Gina Austin (Sonia Todd). Christy and her friends start sending Sasha hate emails and she tells Sasha to stay away from school. While Sasha is leaving the beach by herself, Christy and her friends beat her up. Sasha tells Gina that Christy has been bullying her and Gina finds a video of Christy beating Sasha up. She then expels Christy from the school. Christy later testifies and provokes Sasha at her murder trial

Melissa Gregg

Melissa "Mel" Gregg, played by Allison Cratchley, made her debut screen appearance on 13 April 2012. The character and Cratchley's casting was announced on 31 March 2012. Mel is a doctor and the ex-wife of Harvey Ryan (Marcus Graham).  Of her character, Cratchley said "She had the break-up with Marcus's character and then they separated and she went to the city with another man and their daughter, Lottie, played by Morgan Weaving. But then that relationship breaks down, and since Mel's parents live in Summer Bay, she comes back for a bit of support." Cratchley told a reporter for TV Week that sparks fly between Mel and Harvey's girlfriend, Roo Stewart (Georgie Parker). She added that there would be tension between the two woman and that Mel is a single mother who is "trying to keep her head above water and projecting stuff on to [Roo]." The reporter said Summer Bay would get "a shake-up" when Mel arrives. Mel later has a one-night stand with Harvey and Graham stated "Mel has always had unresolved feelings for him and I think she sees an opportunity and takes it."

Melissa goes to the Summer Bay Caravan Park to have her hair done by Marilyn Chambers (Emily Symons). While they are chatting, Melissa tells Marilyn about her ex-husband, Harvey, and Marilyn reveals she knows him and that he is currently in the hospital. Melissa visits Harvey and explains she broke up with her boyfriend and she and their daughter need his house to live in. Melissa gets a job at the hospital and she goes out for dinner with Sid Walker (Robert Mammone), her new colleague. During her shift at the hospital, a life-threatening car accident comes in and Mel states that she cannot face it. She later reveals to Harvey that she is struggling to cope with their son, Ben's, death. Mel become angry with Harvey when their finances fall into disarray and he has to sell their house. When Lottie comes to her to talk about her relationship issues, Mel snaps at her and Lottie moves in with Harvey. Mel struggles at work and freezes while treating a baby, Sid sends her home. Mel attacks Harvey and his girlfriend, Roo Stewart (Georgie Parker), accuses her of not being there for Lottie. Mel admits that she cannot cope and decides to seek treatment in the city. When Mel returns, she and Harvey start fighting for custody of Lottie. Mel threatens to reveal the truth about Ben's death and Harvey backs down. Roo later goes to see Mel and she explains that Harvey was drunk when Ben died during a boating accident. Lottie tells Mel that she wants to stay in Summer Bay, but when she realises that Mel will be alone in the city, she changes her mind. A few weeks later, Harvey turns up on Mel's doorstep and reveals that his relationship with Roo is over.

Lottie Ryan

Charlotte "Lottie" Ryan, played by Morgan Weaving, made her first screen appearance on 16 April 2012. The character and casting was announced on 31 March 2012. Weaving is the younger sister of Samara Weaving who plays Indigo Walker in the soap. She relocated to Sydney in October 2011 for filming and she revealed "It's nice to be in the same city as Sam and work is an added bonus." Lottie is the daughter of Melissa Gregg (Allison Cratchley) and Harvey Ryan (Marcus Graham). After Melissa broke up with Harvey, she took Lottie to the city where they lived with another man. After that relationship ends, Melissa and Lottie arrive in Summer Bay. Describing her character, Weaving said "she's good fun, a sweet nerd who speaks her mind". On 22 April 2012, Richard Clune of The Daily Telegraph reported Weaving's "escapades as Lottie" would start to gain momentum from that week on.

Harvey meets with Lottie and Mel in Angelo's restaurant in Summer Bay and he apologises for not being there for her. Mel reveals Harvey has a girlfriend and Lottie realises he has not told her about his family. Lottie spends the day with Harvey and Roo Stewart (Georgie Parker) and she is given a new phone. She meets Dexter Walker (Charles Cottier) in The Diner and they play chess together. Lottie wins his money and gives it to Harvey for the phone, so her mother will not continue to be angry with him. Lottie asks Dex if he will be her tutor and he accepts, but he has to cancel their lunch time meeting to comfort April Scott (Rhiannon Fish). Lottie tells Dex about her younger brother's death and he helps her out with her science assignment. She later moves to the city with her mother.

Jett James

Jett James, played by Will McDonald, made his first screen appearance on 7 May 2012. The character and casting was announced in April 2012. McDonald told Andrew Mercado of TV Week that he was "stunned" to get the role of Jett. He explained "I was speechless at first. I honestly thought I was in a dream, and then as reality faded in I realised this was really happening." The character of Jett is McDonald's first television role. Jett arrives in Summer Bay and "wastes no time in ruffling a few feathers", especially those of VJ Patterson (Felix Dean). McDonald described his character as "a delinquent who comes to the Bay and causes a bit of trouble and gets on some people's bad sides." While a writer for Channel 5 said Jett has "a knack for causing trouble". In 2013, McDonald received a nomination for the Most Popular New Male Talent Logie Award.

Natalie Davison

Natalie Davison, played by Catherine Mack, made her first screen appearance on 16 May 2012. The character and casting was announced on 6 May 2012. Mack revealed to Luke Dennehy of the Herald Sun that the role of Natalie "came out of the blue". She explained "I was settled in Los Angeles and when they asked me to send an audition tape, I didn't think much of it. In January I got a call from my agent in Australia and he said 'come back straight away'. I didn't pack anything up because I thought it would be a quick trip." The actress called the role her dream job and said she had always wanted to live in Sydney, where the show is filmed. 

Natalie is a school counsellor, who helps Sasha Bezmel (Demi Harman) and Casey Braxton (Lincoln Younes). A writer for Channel 5 said she would "have her work cut out for her" due to the amount of teen drama in Summer Bay. Mack described her character as having "a very selfless quality and determination to help others that I really admire." She stated that Natalie "is passionate and strong", but she does have flaws. Mack added that Natalie went through some tough times as a teenager, which forced her to grow up quickly. When asked if Natalie interacts with the Braxton brothers, Dan Ewing (who plays Heath Braxton) quipped to a TV Week writer that she has "no direct cuddles" with his character. In June 2012, it was revealed Natalie would become Darryl Braxton's (Steve Peacocke) love interest. Mack said Natalie finds Brax interesting and she is trying to work out who he is and what he is about. In 2013, Mack received a nomination for the Most Popular New Female Talent Logie Award.

In June 2013, it was announced that Mack had decided to leave Home and Away and that she had already filmed her final scenes. The actress told a TV Week reporter "It was time for Natalie to leave the Bay, as she had some unfinished business with her family to attend to. She really needed to move forward with her life." Mack added that she had enjoyed her experience on the show and was looking forward to the future.

Natalie moves into her new office at Summer Bay High and meets her first patient, Sasha. Natalie also starts counselling sessions with Casey Braxton. Natalie encourages Casey to talk to her and he opens up about his father. She tells him to meet his father if he wants to, but his brother, Brax, asks Natalie not to interfere in their lives. Natalie grows concerned for Casey when his father, Danny (Andy McPhee), is released from prison. Natalie grows closer to Brax, prompting him to tell her about Danny's violent past. Natalie and Brax have a one-night stand. Jett James' (Will McDonald) foster mother, Gina Austin (Sonia Todd), asks Natalie to counsel him after his biological father rejects him. However, Natalie realises that she cannot counsel Jett without his full co-operation and consent. Brax becomes worried when Casey spends more time Danny and they disappear from the Bay. He and Natalie learn that Danny is planning to rob a local bar and they go to find Casey. Shortly after getting to the bar, they hear a shot and find Casey has shot Danny. Natalie tries to help Danny, but he later dies. Natalie becomes friends with Bianca Scott (Lisa Gormley). Natalie and Brax notice that Casey is acting strange and they agree to put their relationship on hold to help him. Brax goes on a camping trip with Casey, who later goes missing. Brax and Natalie learn that he has been taken to the desert and they try and track him down. Natalie and Brax find Casey and he tells them about a mysterious girl named Tamara (Kelly Paterniti) who helped him. Natalie initially thinks Casey was hallucinating. Back home, Natalie learns that she must make a statement at Casey's court case. Natalie's testimony is considered questionable and Casey is told that he must check into a detention centre each weekend. Natalie asks Zac MacGuire (Charlie Clausen) to watch over Casey in prison and Brax thanks her. Brax later breaks up with Natalie.

Natalie and Zac become close and start dating. He becomes annoyed with her constant dealings with the Braxtons. She and Brax continue to argue and they eventually confess their love for one another, but she decides to stay with Zac. But Zac tells Natalie to choose between himself or the Braxtons and she distances herself from them.

After Brax is shot by Adam Sharpe (Martin Lynes), Natalie becomes concerned for his welfare. Zac accuses Natalie of still being in love with Brax and she admits that he is right and that she has not got over Brax. Zac and Natalie split up and Zac realizes that the reason Natalie clung to the Braxtons was due to her trying to fill a void in her life caused by her mother leaving her as a child. Zac resolves to help Natalie overcome her issues and when he discovers that Natalie's mother is still alive, Natalie then leaves the Bay to go and find her.

Danny Braxton

Daniel "Danny" Braxton, played by Andy McPhee, made his debut screen appearance on 30 May 2012. The character was announced on 14 May 2012, while McPhee's casting was revealed in January 2012. He began filming in the same month and had a six-month guest contract with the show. Danny is the father of Darryl (Steve Peacocke), Heath (Dan Ewing) and Casey Braxton (Lincoln Younes). A reporter for The West Australian commented "If you thought Home and Away's River Boys were tough, wait until you meet their dad." A TV Week writer stated details about the Braxton's brothers' father "have been few and far between" since their arrival, but that would all change when Heath visits Danny in prison. Ewing explained that after Heath's son is born, he realises he has a lot of questions about his father and why he left the family. He wants to make peace with Danny, so he will feel like a better father towards his son. The TV Week writer explained that there is not a happy family reunion, with Danny's desertion and his criminal past still sore points for Heath. Ewing told the writer "Heath definitely resents his father mainly because he idolised him so much when he was a young teenager. So it's pretty icy and there's a lot of pent-up anguish and emotion." Danny surprises Heath by admitting that he regrets a lot of the things he did in the past, like throwing his family away. Roz Laws from the Sunday Mercury called Danny a "deadbeat dad".

Heath visits Danny in jail and receives an icy reception from him. They eventually relax into conversation and Danny reveals that he has regrets about letting his family go. Brax also visits Danny and realises he has not changed. He tells his father to give up his dream of freedom and Danny reveals that he was not aware Heath is trying to get him out. Brax later returns to the jail with Casey and Heath begins an appeal to free Danny. Danny attends his court hearing and is later freed. He turns up in Summer Bay and Brax allows him to spend the night at his house. Danny later moves into the caravan park and befriends Marilyn Chambers (Emily Symons). Danny tells Brax that he wants his money back and starts playing games with him. Danny invites Marilyn out to dinner, while some guys that he hired knock Brax out and leave him in the bush. When Casey confronts his father, Danny manages to lie his way out of it. Danny hints to Brax that he is going to get his money back from his ex-wife, Cheryl, and Casey becomes aware of Danny's darker side. Danny learns that Ruby Buckton (Rebecca Breeds) has a lot of money and he befriends her, hoping to scam her out of the money. When Heath tells Danny about his son's progress in hospital, Danny does not seem to care. Heath confronts him and Danny lashes out, making Heath realise that he has not changed.

Brax tells Danny to leave Casey alone, but he refuses. Danny is visited by Kyle Bennett (Nicholas Westaway), who gives him a gun and a fake passport. Danny learns that Casey has double crossed him, when Ruby moves into Summer Bay House. Danny attacks Casey, but he pretends to still be on his side. Casey accompanies his father to a motel and Danny robs the bar. They are caught by the owner and Danny pulls out his gun, forcing the owner to open the safe. Danny realises Casey is on Brax's side and asks him to shoot the owner. Casey refuses and shoots Danny instead. Danny is rushed to hospital, but dies in surgery.

Kyle Braxton

Kyle Braxton, played by Nic Westaway, made his first screen appearance on 8 August 2012. The character and casting was announced on 28 June 2012. Digital Spy's Daniel Kilkelly reported that Lincoln Younes had been tweeting about Westaway joining the cast and revealed that he had been listed as a Home and Away series regular on his agency profile. He added "The page names his character as Kyle Braxton, so it seems that recent arrival Danny won't be the last addition to the family!" In September, Kyle kidnaps Casey Braxton (Younes) and holds him hostage in the desert. Younes told TV Week's Erin Miller "There has certainly been someone watching him for few weeks, which you've seen snippets of, and the inference is that it's related to his dad." Kyle eventually reveals that he is Danny Braxton's (Andy McPhee) son.

Tim Graham

Tim Graham, played by Jonny Pasvolsky, made his first screen appearance on 17 August 2012. The character and Pasvolsky's casting was announced on 6 August 2012. Tim is Roo Stewart's (Georgie Parker) ex-boyfriend, who turns up unexpectedly in Summer Bay shortly after she has got engaged to Harvey Ryan (Marcus Graham). Roo and Tim dated while she lived in New York, but the relationship "soured" before her return to Australia.

Of Tim and Roo, Pasvolsky explained "He was married and had an affair with her – he was completely in love with her – but chose in the end to go back to his wife. And then, subsequently, that's fallen through and he's realised that Roo was the love of his life." Tim tries to win Roo back and he does not take no for an answer. He also has "a few tricks up his sleeve" to help him. Pasvolsky described Tim as being suave and well dressed, adding that he has a "New York energy" about him.

Tamara Kingsley

Tamara Jane Kingsley, played by Kelly Paterniti, made her first screen appearance on 1 October 2012 and departed on 21 May 2014. Paterniti relocated from West Australia to Sydney for filming. She revealed that she was initially nervous about joining Home and Away, saying "There is the fear that at some point you are going to be in a bikini, and that did play on my mind. You can't obsess over it, though. I think once you rip the bandaid off, it's fine."

Tamara became involved in a love triangle with Casey Braxton (Lincoln Younes) and Sasha Bezmel (Demi Harman) in late 2012. Paterniti revealed that things would become more complicated for the trio in 2013. Tamara feels that she has an instant connection to Casey, especially because she helped him out when he was in "a really vulnerable state". Tamara's ex-boyfriend, Nelson (Anthony Gee), arrives in Summer Bay and Paterniti revealed that Tamara was involved in "a fairly abusive relationship" with him.

Lisa Flemming

Lisa Flemming, played by Rachael Beck, made her first screen appearance on 5 October 2012 and 22 November 2012. The character and casting was announced on 3 September 2012. Lisa is a physiotherapist who helps Dexter Walker (Charles Cottier) with his recovery following his involvement in a car crash. A writer for the official Home and Away website stated "She has a few surprises in her storyline which cause a certain doctor to do some soul searching." It was later revealed that Lisa would be a love interest for Dex's father, Sid (Robert Mammone). Sid hits it off with Lisa and he admires her positivity and her "can-do attitude." Lisa meets with Sid for lunch to discuss Dex, but sparks begin flying and they later share a kiss in the back of Sid's car. Mammone stated "The chemistry is obvious between these two, but it's complicated."

Sid Walker meets up with Lisa to discuss his son, Dex's, physiotherapy. They begin flirting over lunch and start kissing in the back of Sid's car. When Dex starts to feel like a burden, Lisa talks to him and make him see that he can be useful. Sid tells Lisa that what happened between them was a mistake and it cannot happen again. However, he later apologises and asks to keep seeing her. Sid and Lisa decide to keep their relationship a secret, but Dex notices them together and reveals that Lisa is married. Sid confronts her and she reveals that she is separated from her husband, Neil (Josef Ber), but he does stay over at their house occasionally. Sid allows Lisa to continue with Dex's treatment and they start their relationship over in secret. However, when Dex finds out about it and becomes angry, Sid breaks up with Lisa. Dex later invites Lisa to Indigo (Samara Weaving) and Romeo Smith's (Luke Mitchell) wedding and she tells Sid that her husband will not let her go.

Lisa announces that she is going to leave Neil. During a training session with Dex, Lisa takes a call and does not notice him falling over. Angry with Lisa, Sid goes to her house where Neil informs him that she is not home. Neil then confronts Lisa about her relationship with Sid, but she denies that anything has happened. Lisa later comes to the Walker's home with a bruised face. Lisa tells Sid that Neil has been physically abusing her for a few years. Sid lets her stay the night and when they go to collect her things, they find Neil has changed the locks. Lisa later tells Neil that she wants to leave and takes out an AVO against him. Sid is later attacked by Neil. When Lisa learns that Neil came to the Walker's house, she is upset at the thought of Sid's family being involved in her problems. Neil threatens Indi when he cannot find Lisa and is arrested. When he is released, Lisa calls him. She then tells Sid that she is returning to Neil, so he will not take his anger out on Sid's family any more. Lisa explains that she will then leave him for good, before saying goodbye to Sid.

Adam Sharpe

Adam Sharpe, played by Martin Lynes, made his first screen appearance on 16 October 2012. Dan Ewing teased Adam's arrival, saying that he is one of the "worst guys" from the Braxton family's past. While Darryl Braxton (Steve Peacocke) welcomes his "former mentor", his brother, Heath (Ewing) does not. Ewing said "Heath went to jail when he was younger and he blames Adam for that. Adam's a bad egg, but he's charming and has lots of money, so he's not the clichéd nasty guy." Adam later agrees to help Heath's on-off girlfriend, Bianca Scott (Lisa Gormley), get some drugs, so she can cope with the death of her son. After a brief departure, Adam returned on 7 May 2013.

Adam is a friend of the Braxton brothers, who arrives in Summer Bay to help them locate their missing half-brother, Kyle (Nic Westaway). He offers guidance to Casey Braxton (Lincoln Younes) and helps pay off Darryl Braxton's (Steve Peacocke) debt. Adam meets Bianca Scott, who is suffering with the loss of her son, and she asks him for some drugs. Bianca starts to rely on Adam, as he continues to supply her with pills. Heath asks Adam to stay from Bianca, but Adam taunts him about her instead. He then tries to blackmail him into doing a job for him. Adam and Brax locate Kyle in Melbourne. Adam has sex with Bianca and her estranged husband, Liam Murphy (Axle Whitehead), confronts him about supplying her with drugs. Adam warns his son, Jamie (Hugo Johnstone-Burt), to stay away from Leah Patterson-Baker (Ada Nicodemou). He becomes angry with Jamie when he learns that he trashed the Diner. Adam asks Liam to organise a party for him and states that he will cut Bianca loose. However, he goes back on his word and Heath comes to get Bianca, who refuses to leave. Adam later asks Bianca if she wants him to get rid of Heath, but she tells him no. Bianca later breaks up with Adam. Jamie then leaves Heath for dead under Adam's orders but then Heath survives. Brax then cuts ties with Adam. Brax, Liam, Heath and Kyle then set a trap for Jamie into finding Leah. Brax then give Adam an ultimatum either Adam and Jamie get arrested or for Adam to never see Jamie again. Adam and Jamie are later arrested for their crimes.

When Adam is released and he kidnaps Heath's daughter Darcy Callahan (Alea O'Shea). He calls Heath and says the way to get her back is doing a dangerous job for him. Heath and Brax later go to a warehouse to meet Adam and Brax decides to do the job instead of Heath. Adam leaves Brax to make a deal with someone but Heath then finds someone who was going to shoot Brax. The dealer then escapes. Brax then goes to Adam and the dealer finds him and tries to run him over but Adam pushes him out of the way and later takes full impact of the vehicle. Brax and Heath end up leaving Adam for dead. However, Adam survives and uses his sister Ricky Sharpe (Bonnie Sveen) to seek revenge against the brothers. He frames Casey for a robbery and kidnaps Casey's girlfriend, Tamara Kingsley (Kelly Paterniti), holding her hostage with Ricky, who turns against him due to her feelings for Brax. He lets Tamara go and gets Brax to meet him. He later shoots Brax while he was trying to save Ricky, leaving him fighting for his life, he then goes to Brax's hospital room and tries to finish him off but is caught by Heath and Dexter Walker (Charles Cottier). Adam is later arrested for his crimes and sentenced to 25 years to life in prison. Casey and Ricky visit Adam to ask him to tell the police Brax was a teenager when he killed Johnny Barrett (Stephen Anderton). Adam later confesses that he actually killed Johnny, not Brax.

Jamie Sharpe

James "Jamie" Sharpe, played by Hugo Johnstone-Burt, made his first screen appearance on 19 October 2012 and departed on 8 March 2013. The character and Johnstone-Burt's casting was revealed on 28 June 2012. The actor revealed "I'm doing a little stint on Home and Away. I'm playing a super-creepy stalker guy." He added that he was working a lot with Ada Nicodemou who plays Leah Patterson-Baker.

Nicodemou revealed that when Leah and Jamie see each other at a fundraising night, there is "an attraction across the room". Leah thinks Jamie is "very cute" and when he later approaches her, they share a kiss. Leah is hesitant about starting a romantic relationship with Jamie, especially as she has a young son and there is an age gap between them. However, Jamie does not mind their age difference and begins sending Leah lots of text messages asking for a date. Leah eventually agrees to go out with him and Nicodemou explained "On the date, Jamie's very open and interested in finding out about VJ. He opens up about his own family, and Leah really feels for him." Following the date, Leah invites Jamie to spend the night with her and Nicodemou thought that there was "definitely chemistry" between them. The next day Jamie starts "showering" Leah with gifts, which makes her feel uncomfortable.

Claire Crick from All About Soap called Jamie "creepy" and stated "At first, his gifts seemed sweet, but what appeared to be innocent enough soon turned sinister when Leah told Jamie she wasn't interested, so he trashed the Diner… Um, that's not really how normal people deal with rejection, Jamie!" Crick went on to say that she did not blame Leah for running away and thought that viewers had not seen the last of "Jamie's weird ways".

Jamie attends a fundraiser at Angelo's Restaurant in Summer Bay and catches the eye of Leah Patterson-Baker. Her friend, Marilyn (Emily Symons), goes up on stage and reveals to Jamie that Leah likes him. Jamie then comes over to talk to Leah and they share a kiss at the end of the night. Jamie sends Leah text messages asking her out on a date and comes to meet her at the Surf Club. Leah tells him she thinks she is too old for him, but Jamie states that he likes her and does not mind her having a son. He invites her out to dinner, where he reveals that his mother died while she having an affair. Leah invites Jamie back to her house and they have sex. The following day, Jamie sends Leah lots of gifts, including an expensive scarf. He tells her that he will pick her up at eight o'clock for another date, but is told by Liam Murphy (Axle Whitehead) that Leah has gone out.

As Leah soon changes her mind about embarking on a relationship with Jamie she continuously tries to cut ties with Jamie but when he begins to take a dark turn by watching her sleep and deliberately spending time with VJ things come to a head when VJ tries to warn Jamie off he violently grabs his arm threatening him Leah arrives just in time and packs her things, says goodbye before departing Summer Bay and escaping Jamie. Jamie later leaves Heath for dead under Adam's orders. He and Adam are later arrested for their crimes. Jamie then goes to prison where Casey is doing time as well. Casey then saves Jamie from getting attacked and Jamie is later transferred.

Others

References

External links
Characters and cast at the Official AU Home and Away website
Characters and cast at the Official UK Home and Away website
Characters and cast at the Internet Movie Database
Natalie Davison at the Official AU Home and Away website

, 2012
, Home and Away